Diamakani is a village in the far north of Ivory Coast. It is in the sub-prefecture of Tengréla, Tengréla Department, Bagoué Region, Savanes District. Three kilometres northeast of the village is a border crossing with Mali.

Diamakani was a commune until March 2012, when it became one of 1126 communes nationwide that were abolished.

Notes

Former communes of Ivory Coast
Populated places in Savanes District
Ivory Coast–Mali border crossings
Populated places in Bagoué